Medium Rarities may refer to:
 Medium Rarities (Mastodon album) (2020)
 Medium Rarities ("Weird Al" Yankovic album) (2017)
 Medium Rarities, a 2018 compilation album by Cattle Decapitation